Upland is a ghost town in Upton County, Texas, United States, about  north of Rankin.

See also
List of ghost towns in Texas
Llano Estacado

References 

Ghost towns in West Texas
Geography of Upton County, Texas